The Juan de Anza House (Spanish: Casa Juan de Anza), also known as the Casa de Anza (English: Anza House), is a historic adobe house in San Juan Bautista, California. Built around 1830, Casa de Anza is a well-preserved example of residential construction from the period of Mexican California. It was declared a National Historic Landmark in 1970.

History

The house was probably built about 1835, during the period when California was part of Mexico, and after the Mission San Juan Bautista was secularized.  Its construction methods clearly predate developments in the late 1830s, when American methods of frame construction began to be merged into the Mexican vernacular adobe style.

In the 1870s Francisco Bravo adapted the building for commercial use as a cantina, and it has generally been used for commercial purposes since then.

Description

Casa Juan de Anza is located in the downtown area of San Juan Bautista, at the southwest corner of Franklin and Third Streets.  It is a single-story adobe structure, built out of vertically placed wooden poles and mud bricks, with exterior and interior finishes of lime plaster.

It is covered by a low-pitch gabled roof with redwood shingles, which extends across an open veranda extending the width of the building, supported by simple square wooden posts.  It has four bays on the front, three of which are occupied by doors or full-height windows.  A wood-frame addition extends across the full width of the rear, covered by a shed roof.  The interior has five rooms, some of which have 19th-century redwood floors.

See also
 National Register of Historic Places listings in San Benito County, California

References

History of San Benito County, California
Mexican California
Adobe buildings and structures in California
Houses on the National Register of Historic Places in California
National Historic Landmarks in California
San Juan Bautista, California
Houses in San Benito County, California
National Register of Historic Places in San Benito County, California